The 40th Kerala Film Critics Association Awards, honouring the best Malayalam films released in 2016, were announced in March 2017.

Winners

Main Awards 
 Best Film: Oppam
 Best Actor: Mohanlal (Oppam)
 Best Actress: Nayanthara (Puthiya Niyamam)
 Best Director: Priyadarshan (Oppam)
 Second Best Film: Jacobinte Swargarajyam
 Best Popular Film: Pulimurugan
 Second Best Actor (Male): Renji Panicker (Jacobinte Swargarajyam) and Siddique (Sukhamayirikkatte)
 Second Best Actor (Female): Surabhi Lakshmi (Minnaminungu)
 Best Screenplay: Vineeth Sreenivasan(Jacobinte Swargarajyam)
 Best Music Director: M. Jayachandran (Kambhoji)
 Best Male Playback Singer: Madhu Balakrishnan
 Best Female Playback Singer: Varsha Vinu and Alka Ajith
 Best Cinematographer: Sujith Vaassudev (James And Alice)
 Best Lyricist: Vayalar Sarath Chandra Varma (Kochavva Paulo Ayyappa Coelho)
 Best Editing: Abhilash Balachandran (Vetta)
 Best Child Artist: Baby Esther Anil and Baby Akshara
 Best Sound Design: Dan Jose (Aadupuliyattam)
 Best Art Director: M. Bava (Action Hero Biju)
 Best Costume Design: Indrans Jayan (Kambhoji)
 Best Makeup: Saji Koratti (Oppam)

Special Jury Awards 
 Socially Relevant Film: Saji S. Palamel (Aaradi / Six Feet)
 Sanskrit Film: M. Surendran (Suryakantha)
 Technical Excellence: Nissar (2 Days)
 Acting: Lakshmi Gopalaswamy (Kambhoji)
 Acting: Nivin Pauly (Action Hero Biju)
 Acting: Tini Tom (Daffedar)
 Acting: Samuthirakani (Oppam)

Honourary Awards 
 Chalachitra Ratnam Award: Sreekumaran Thampi
 Ruby Jubilee Award: Adoor Gopalakrishnan
 Chalachitra Prathibha Award: Fazil, Ramachandra Babu, Shanthi Krishna

References

External links
 "List of recipients of the Kerala Film Critics Association Awards" (in Malayalam)

2016 Indian film awards
2016